Capurso is a town and comune of around 16,000 inhabitants in the Metropolitan City of Bari, Apulia, Italy, located about  southeast of the capital. Capurso has many places to visit, for example the local church named Madonna del Pozzo.

Twin towns
 Schiller Park, USA, since 1994

References

Cities and towns in Apulia